Hensel may refer to:

People
 Bruce Hensel, 11-time Emmy-award-winning former Chief Medical Correspondent for KNBC
 Kaden Hensel (born 1986), inactive Australian tennis player
 Robert M. Hensel (born 1969), Guinness World Records holder for the longest non-stop wheelie in a wheelchair
 Witold Hensel (1917–2008), Polish archaeologist

Germany
 Albert Hensel (1895–1942), German Communist executed under the Nazis
 Alfred Hensel (1880–1969), German architect and director of the Nuremberg parks department
 Daniel Hensel (born 1978), German composer, VJ, musicologist and music theorist
 Fanny Mendelssohn (also Fanny Hensel; 1805–1847), German pianist and composer
 Friederike Sophie Seyler (née Hensel; 1737/17381789), German actress, playwright and librettist
 Gottfried Hensel (1687–1765), German linguist
 Gustav Hensel (1884–1933), German international footballer
 Julius Hensel (1833), German agricultural and physiological chemist or pharmacist
 Kurt Hensel (1861–1941), German mathematician
 Luise Hensel (1798–1876), German religious author and poet
 Marc Hensel (born 1986), German retired footballer
 Michael Ulrich Hensel (born 1965), German architect, researcher, educator and writer
 Paul Hensel (1860–1930), German philosopher
 Paul Hensel (politician) (1867-1944), German Lutheran theologian and politician
 Wilhelm Hensel (1794–1861), German painter

United States
 Abby and Brittany Hensel (born 1990), American dicephalic parapagus twins
 Donald Hensel (1926-2020), American politician
 H. Struve Hensel (1901–1991), American international lawyer
 Karen Hensel, American actress
 Nancy H. Hensel (born 1943), American academic and university administrator
 W. U. Hensel (1851–1915), Pennsylvania newspaper editor, lawyer, author, and state Attorney General

Other
 Canton City, North Dakota (also Hensel, ND), a town located on the east edge of Park Township in Pembina County, North Dakota, United States
 Hensel Formation, a Mesozoic geologic formation in Texas
 Hensel Phelps Construction, one of the largest general contractors and construction managers in the United States
 Hensel's lemma, a result in modular arithmetic
 Hensel's snake (Ditaxodon taeniatus), a snake endemic to southern Brazil
 Henselian ring (also Hensel ring), a local ring in which Hensel's lemma holds
 Microtus henseli (also Hensel's vole), a rodent found in Sardinia and Corsica

Surnames from given names
German-language surnames